Scott Davis and Tim Wilkison were the defending champions but lost in the first round to Tim Pawsat and Laurie Warder.

Rick Leach and Jim Pugh won in the final 6–7, 6–3, 6–2, 2–6, 6–4 against Paul Annacone and Christo van Rensburg.

Seeds

  Ken Flach /  Robert Seguso (quarterfinals)
  Sergio Casal /  Emilio Sánchez (quarterfinals)
  Rick Leach /  Jim Pugh (champions)
  Paul Annacone /  Christo van Rensburg (final)

Draw

Draw

External links
 Main draw

1989
1989 Eagle Classic